The Third Yoshida Cabinet was the 49th Cabinet of Japan. It was headed by Shigeru Yoshida from February 16, 1949, to October 30, 1952.

Cabinet

Initial composition

Reorganized Cabinet 
The Cabinet was reorganized on June 1, 1949.

First Cabinet reshuffle 
The first Cabinet reshuffle took place on June 28, 1950.

Second Cabinet reshuffle 
The second Cabinet reshuffle took place on July 4, 1951.

Third Cabinet reshuffle 
The third Cabinet reshuffle took place on December 26, 1951.

References 

Cabinet of Japan
1949 establishments in Japan
Cabinets established in 1949
Cabinets disestablished in 1952
1952 disestablishments in Japan